The Sauer S 2200 UL is a 4 stroke aircraft engine designed for homebuilt and ultralight aircraft.

Design and development
The engine is based on the Volkswagen air-cooled engine. It is extensively modified for aircraft use and all the parts are custom made. The engine is derived from the certified engines produced by the same manufacturer and used in several motorgliders and light aircraft.

Applications
Groppo Trial
Rans S-6 Coyote II

Specifications (variant)

References

External links

S2200UL